This is a list of international presidential trips made by Cyril Ramaphosa while President. Ramaphosa assumed the office of president on 15 February 2018
and made his first international trip as the President of South Africa to Luanda, Angola.

Summary of international trips

2018

2019

2020

2021

2022

2023

References

Presidential
Ramaphosa, Cyril
Ramaphosa
Presidential
21st century in international relations
Rampahosa, Cyril
Ramaphosa